In mathematics, specifically algebraic topology, the cohomology ring of a topological space X is a ring formed from the cohomology groups of X together with the cup product serving as the ring multiplication. Here 'cohomology' is usually understood as singular cohomology, but the ring structure is also present in other theories such as de Rham cohomology. It is also functorial: for a continuous mapping of spaces one obtains a ring homomorphism on cohomology rings, which is contravariant.

Specifically, given a sequence of cohomology groups Hk(X;R) on X with coefficients in a commutative ring R (typically R is Zn, Z, Q, R, or C) one can define the cup product, which takes the form

The cup product gives a multiplication on the direct sum of the cohomology groups

This multiplication turns H•(X;R) into a ring. In fact, it is naturally an N-graded ring with the nonnegative integer k serving as the degree. The cup product respects this grading.

The cohomology ring is graded-commutative in the sense that the cup product commutes up to a sign determined by the grading. Specifically, for pure elements of degree k and ℓ; we have

A numerical invariant derived from the cohomology ring is the cup-length, which means the maximum number of graded elements of degree ≥ 1 that when multiplied give a non-zero result. For example a complex projective space has cup-length equal to its complex dimension.

Examples 
 where .
 where .
 where .
 where .
 where .
 where .
The reduced cohomology ring of wedge sums is the direct product of their reduced cohomology rings.
The cohomology ring of suspensions vanishes except for the degree 0 part.

See also 
Quantum cohomology

References
 
 

Homology theory